Hashmatrai Khubchand Chainani (29 February 1904 – 28 November 1965) was the Chief Justice of the Bombay High Court.

Early life
Chainani was born to a Sindhi family in 1904 in British India. He primarily studied in Hyderabad, then admitted to D J Sindh College of Karachi. In 1925 he passed B.A. in Natural Science Tripos from Magdalene College, Cambridge, England. After passing Indian Civil Service, Chainani returned to India in 1927 and was first appointed Assistant Collector at Sholapur then at Nasik, Khandesh and Poona.

Career
He started his judicial career as an Assistant Judge at Poona in 1933 and was promoted as District and Sessions Judge at Sholapur. In 1935, he was appointed Secretary to the Bombay Legislative Council and Assistant Legal Remembrancer. In 1944 Chainani became the Joint Secretary of Home Department, Government of Bombay then transferred as Deputy Secretary to the Home Department of Government of India. He also worked as Revenue Commissioner. He was promoted to a Puisne Judge of the Bombay High Court and after Justice M C Chagla he was appointed the Chief Justice of Bombay High Court in 1958. In 1962 Chainani also worked as acting governor of the State of Maharashtra and honorary secretary of Environmental Action Group of Bombay.

References

1904 births
1965 deaths
20th-century Indian judges
People from Karachi
Indian diplomats
Indian judges
Judges of the Bombay High Court
Chief Justices of the Bombay High Court
Governors of Maharashtra
Sindhi people
20th-century Indian lawyers
Indian Civil Service (British India) officers
Indian civil servants
Indian government officials
Alumni of Magdalene College, Cambridge